Smt. Suryakanta Vyas affectionately known as "Jiji", is a prominent figure of the Pushkarna Brahmin community in Rajasthan. Jiji is current Member of the Legislative Assembly of Bharatiya Janata Party from Soorsagar constituency of Jodhpur. She is serving for the third time from this constituency, defeating Prof. Aiyub Khan of INC in 2018 by over 5000 votes. She won by a record margin in 2013. She contested election for the first time from Jodhpur's (Old City) constituency in year 1990 and won comprehensively thrice in 1990, 1993 and 2003 before contesting from Soorsagar in 2008. She has an impressive record of being 6 time MLA from the 7 elections she has contested.

"Jiji" was born in Kalla family and her father, Late Shri Fatehraj Ji Kalla was Police Inspector. She got married at an early age of 12 and her husband, Late Shri Uma Shankar Ji Vyas was Supply officer. She joined Rashtriya Swayamsevak Sangh in 1960 & held a no. of honorable posts such as President of Female wing, BJP. She volunteered arrest & went to Jail to protest against injustice during Doda Satyagraha Movement (1994). She also led the female wing for 'Ramjanma-bhumi' movement & went to Kashmir for 'Flag hoisting yatra' (1994). She has been honored a number of times for rendering services for development of society. She is one of the most popular faces in Jodhpur & Rajasthan assembly. Known for her oratory skills, she was also elected as the best MLA in the assembly for the year 2012.

References 
 rajassembly website

People from Jodhpur
Rajasthan MLAs 2013–2018
1938 births
Women members of the Rajasthan Legislative Assembly
Living people
Rajasthan MLAs 1990–1992
Rajasthan MLAs 1993–1998
Rajasthan MLAs 2003–2008
Rajasthan MLAs 2008–2013
21st-century Indian women politicians
21st-century Indian politicians
20th-century Indian women politicians
20th-century Indian politicians
Bharatiya Janata Party politicians from Rajasthan